The 1961 VFL Grand Final was an Australian rules football game contested between the Footscray Football Club and Hawthorn Football Club, held at the Melbourne Cricket Ground in Melbourne on 23 September 1961. It was the 64th annual Grand Final of the Victorian Football League, staged to determine the premiers for the 1961 VFL season. The match, attended by 107,935 spectators, was won by Hawthorn by a margin of 43 points, marking that club's first premiership victory.

Hawthorn, who were competing in their inaugural VFL Grand Final despite being in the competition since 1925, came into the game as minor premiers and favourites. Footscray, the 1954 premiership winners, had finished the home and away season in fourth place but upset the Ron Barassi-led Melbourne by 27 points in the Preliminary Final to end the Demons' sequence of seven consecutive Grand Final appearances.

It was a young Footscray side, with only two players coming into the game with more than 80 VFL games behind them, although one of them was veteran Ted Whitten. Hawthorn's Brendan Edwards was playing in his 100th VFL game and dominated in the centre. Despite trailing at half time, Hawthorn won comfortably in the end courtesy of a dominant third quarter in which they kicked six goals to just one by Footscray.

The Bulldogs did not appear in another Grand Final until 2016, which they won.

The 1961 Grand Final is the oldest currently available on DVD. Videos of the 1962, 1963 and 1964 Grand Finals have not yet surfaced.  It is also the first Grand Final in VFL/AFL history that did not include any of the original eight clubs that formed the VFL in 1897 (Carlton, Collingwood, Essendon, Fitzroy, Geelong, Melbourne, St. Kilda, South Melbourne).

Teams

{|
|valign="top"|

Umpire: Frank Schwab

Scoreboard

Statistics

Goal kickers

Attendance
 MCG attendance – 107,935

See also
 1961 VFL season

References
1961 Grand Final page on AFL Tables
 The Official statistical history of the AFL 2004
 Ross, J. (ed), 100 Years of Australian Football 1897–1996: The Complete Story of the AFL, All the Big Stories, All the Great Pictures, All the Champions, Every AFL Season Reported, Viking, (Ringwood), 1996. 

VFL/AFL Grand Finals
Grand
Hawthorn Football Club
Western Bulldogs